Junk Brothers is a reality television series broadcast by HGTV Canada. Brothers and show hosts Steve and Jim Kelley collect discarded items and use these to create new furniture. These works are then returned to the people who discarded them; the former owners of the 'junk' do not expect their discards to be refurbished in this manner.

The first episode aired 6 April 2006. By July 2006, the series was also televised on the American HGTV network. A second season began airing in Canada and the US in January 2007.

External links
HGTV: Junk Brothers, official program information, accessed 8 February 2008
HGTV FAQ (indicated first airdate), accessed 20 August 2006

2000s Canadian reality television series
2006 Canadian television series debuts
2007 Canadian television series endings
HGTV (Canada) original programming
Television duos